Robert George Byers (18 April 1871 – 17 December 1952) was an Australian rules footballer who played with Essendon in the Victorian Football League (VFL).

Notes

External links 

1871 births
1952 deaths
Australian rules footballers from Western Australia
Essendon Football Club players
South Fremantle Football Club players
Fremantle Football Club (1881–1899) players
East Fremantle Football Club players
Australian rules footballers from Ballarat